"Summer" is a song by the band War, recorded on April 4, 1976 and released on June 21, 1976, as a single from their Greatest Hits album in 1976. "Summer" peaked at number seven on the Billboard Hot 100 pop singles chart and number four on the R&B chart.  The track peaked at number one on the Easy Listening chart and was one of three entries to make the chart.

Chart positions

Certifications

See also
List of number-one adult contemporary singles of 1976 (U.S.)

References

1976 singles
War (American band) songs